Danny Detective Inc. is a 2021 Bengali language thriller and suspense web series written and directed by Anjan Dutt.

The series starring Barun Chanda, Ankita Chakraborty, Anjan Dutt, Samadarshi Dutta, Sudipa Basu, and Suprobhat Das are in lead roles.

The whole story of the series is based on the book "Danny Detective Inc" written by Anjan Dutt.

Music of the series is composed by Neel Dutt and cinematography is done by Pravatendu Mondal.

Cast 
Barun Chanda
Ankita Chakraborty 
Anjan Dutt 
Sudipa Basu 
Suprobhat Das 
Samadarshi Dutta

Synopsis 
Reporter Subrata Sharma quits his job to work for Kolkata's Danny Detective Inc., a small-time detective service. His supervisor, Danny, is slain while working on an abduction case. Subrata is compelled to take on the case by circumstances. He goes to Dooars to investigate a major criminal organisation and apprehends the murderer. He assumes control of the organisation.

Episodes

Soundtrack 
1. Danny Detective INC (Original Score from the series)

References

External links 
 

Indian thriller films
2021 films
Bengali-language web series
Indian web series